The Labour Representation Committee (LRC) is a British socialist pressure group within the Labour Party and wider labour movement. It is often seen as representing the most left-wing members of the Labour Party.

Overview
The LRC was formed at a founding conference on Saturday 3 July 2004, taking its name from the original Labour Representation Committee, formed in February 1900.

The LRC encourages Constituency Labour Parties (CLPs) and Branch Labour Parties (BLPs) to affiliate, along with local, regional and national unions, and individual party members and supporters. It has around 150 affiliates and 1000 individual members. In parliament, the group is represented by the Socialist Campaign Group. The LRC also has a youth group, the Socialist Youth Network.

The Chairman is John McDonnell, who the LRC supported as a candidate for leader of the Labour Party. Its Organiser is Lizzie Woods. Joint-National Secretaries are Andrew Fisher and Peter Firmin. Its Vice-Chairs are Jenny Lennox and Susan Press. The Treasurer is Graham Bash, Editor of Labour Briefing. They are the current officers of the organisation.

According to LRC affiliate Socialist Appeal, in November 2014: "The Labour Representation Committee has lost a third of its members and is now down to 600 – in a party of 190,000. It is teetering on the verge of collapse." Despite this claim, LRC members were involved in launching the activist Socialist Campaign for a Labour Victory in early 2015.

LRC Youth 
LRC Youth is a section of the LRC for those aged 27 and under. It was founded as the Socialist Youth Network in March 2007 and relaunched in 2012 under its current name.

National Committee 
The National Committee is elected annually by delegates to the LRC's annual general meeting. Its members are elected for 12 months to conduct general business between annual general meetings. It is responsible for electing, and holding to account, an Executive Committee, which is responsible for any general business between meetings of the National Committee. The National Committee is also responsible for the preparation of publications, and for appointing delegates to represent the LRC.

The current National Committee is elected at the LRC's annual general meeting in November, and its membership is as follows:

Affiliated MPs 
The Representation Committee has a number of officially affiliated MPs, those being:

Jeremy Corbyn MP
John McDonnell MP

Affiliated unions 
The LRC maintains support from a number of trade unions, the most prominent of these being:
ASLEF
BFAWU
Communication Workers Union
Fire Brigades Union
NUM
RMT

Affiliated Constituency Labour Parties
Ashton-under-Lyne CLP
Brentford and Isleworth CLP
Chingford and Woodford Green CLP
Delyn CLP
Ilford South CLP
Isle of Wight CLP
Islington North CLP
Leeds Central CLP
Leyton and Wanstead CLP
St Helens South CLP

Affiliated Branch Labour Parties
Bloomsbury and Kings Cross BLP
Brislington East BLP
Henleaze BLP
Hastings and Rye East BLP
Kensal Green BLP
Newport and West Wight BLP
Sutton BLP

Other affiliated organisations
 Campaign for Socialism (Scotland)
 Momentum (organisation)
 Keep Our NHS Public
 Reclaiming Education
 People's Assembly Against Austerity
 Free Speech on Israel
 Jewish Voice for Labour
 Labour Against the Witchhunt
 Jewish Socialist Group
 Hands off the People of Iran

See also 
Compass (think tank)
Socialist Campaign Group
Socialist Campaign for a Labour Victory

References

External links 

Jeremy Corbyn leadership campaign

2004 establishments in the United Kingdom
Labour Party (UK) factions
Organisations associated with the Labour Party (UK)
Democratic socialism
History of the Labour Party (UK)